Christopher James van Huizen (born 28 November 1992) is a Singaporean professional footballer who plays as a full-back or winger for Singapore Premier League club Lion City Sailors and the Singapore national team.

Club career
Van Huizen went for trials with Geylang International when he was young and duly impressed the coaches at Geylang was rewarded with a place at the Geylang U-16 squad. He was due to play for S.League giants Tampines Rovers' Prime League squad when he turned 17 but saw his opportunity derailed by National Service. Van Huizen rejected the chance to play for the SAFSA team during his 2 years of service and almost gave up on continuing professional football.

A second chance came calling for Van Huizen when he entered the professional football scene in Singapore through his involvement in a MediaCorp Channel 5 TV series, First XI.

Tampines Rovers
Following his performance in the reality TV series, Tampines Rovers coach Rafi Ali offered Van Huizen a two-year contract to play for both the Prime League and the S.League teams.

LionsXII
Alongside Sahil Suhaimi, Wahyudi Wayid and Izzdin Shafiq, Van Huizen was unveiled as one of the new LionsXII signings by Fandi Ahmad for the 2015 Malaysia Super League season. This marks a remarkable turnaround for the "boy from the reality series" to a potential national team player.

Van Huizen made his LionsXII debut as a substitute in the opening game of the season, coming on to make a brief cameo appearance against PDRM FA in a 5-3 victory for the Lions.

Tampines Rovers
Following the exit of LionsXII from the Malaysia Super League, Van Huizen rejoined Tampines Rovers. He scored his first goal of the season in a 1-2 win over Garena Young Lions, helping the Stags climb to joint-top of the 2016 S.League season.

Garena Young Lions
Van Huizen signed for Garena Young Lions on 1 July 2016. This was following a season at Tampines Rovers where he was used sparingly only.

Home United
Van Huizen then signed for the Protectors but only managed to play a small role in the squad.

Geylang International
Van Huizen had a stellar season in the 2019 Singapore Premier League season, when he racked up 10 assists, the highest in the league. On 11 November 2021, he leaves Geylang International, considering retirement from football.

Tampines Rovers 
Van Huizen rejoined Tampines Rovers in 2022 with a one year deal.

Lion City Sailors 
Van Huizen joined the Lion City Sailors in 2023.

International career
Having impressed in his first season in the 2014 S.League Season, Van Huizen was rewarded with a call-up to the Singapore U-21 squad, by Richard Bok, for the Thanh Niên Cup in Vietnam.

In 2015, Van Huizen was called up to the senior team for the 2018 World Cup qualifiers. He made his senior team international debut in a 3-0 loss against Japan, coming on with 10 minutes left on the clock.

He earned his third cap in a friendly against Myanmar, coming on for the final 15 minutes of the game.

In 2022, Van Huizen was included in the team for the 2022 FAS Tri-Nations Series and 2022 AFF Championship.

Career statistics

Club

International

Honours

Club 
LionsXII
FA Cup Malaysia: 2015

Notes

References

External links

Living people
1992 births
Singaporean people of Dutch descent
Singaporean footballers
Singapore international footballers
Tampines Rovers FC players
Singapore Premier League players
Association football midfielders
Singapore youth international footballers